List of Swedish handball champions may refer to:

 List of Swedish men's handball champions
 List of Swedish women's handball champions